Clepsis pallidana is a moth of the family Tortricidae. It is found in most of Europe, as well as Asia Minor, Iran, Russia (Primorsk and Tuva), Mongolia, China, the Korean Peninsula and Japan.

The wingspan is 15–20 mm. Adults are on wing from June to July in western Europe.

The larvae feed on a wide range of plants, including of Artemisia campestris, Gnaphalium, Euphorbia, Spiraea ulmaria, Lactuca scariola, Aster, Urtica, Iris, Jurinea, Solidago, Sedum and Malus.

References

External links
 Fauna Europaea

Clepsis
Moths of the Middle East
Moths of Japan
Moths of Europe
Moths described in 1776
Taxa named by Johan Christian Fabricius